Title 52 of the United States Code (52 U.S.C.), entitled "Voting and Elections", is a codification of the "general and permanent" voting and election laws of the United States federal government. It was adopted as a result of "editorial reclassification" efforts of the Office of the Law Revision Counsel of the United States House of Representatives and was not enacted as positive law.

See also
Emoluments Clause (disambiguation)

References

External links
52 U.S.C. Legal Information Institute

52
United States election law